Mandor railway station is a main railway station in Jodhpur district, Rajasthan. Its code is MDB. It serves Jodhpur city. The station consists of 2 platforms. The platform is not well sheltered. It lacks many facilities including water and sanitation. It is located approximately 8 km from Jodhpur railway station. The railway station is under the administrative control of North Western Railway of Indian Railways.

Major trains

Some of the important trains that run from Mandor are:

 Ranikhet Express 
 Corbett Park Link Express
 Jodhpur–Jaisalmer Passenger

References

Railway stations in Jodhpur district
Transport in Jodhpur
Jodhpur railway division
Buildings and structures in Jodhpur
Jodhpur